Zuni.vn is an e-learning website which was founded by Vietnam Internet User Community Foundation (VNIF) and VNG Corporation. Zuni was launched on March 13, 2014. At that time, the website had approximately 60,000 users, 300 video lessons, 1700 sample tests of eight main subjects used for Vietnamese university entrance exam including Mathematics, Physics, Chemistry, English, Literacy, Biography, History, Geography.

History 
Zuni.vn project started at the end of 2012 by Vietnam Internet Fund (VNIF) and VNG Corporation. Mr. Le Hong Minh, Director cum CEO cum founder of VNG Corporation, is Zuni’s founder.

Managed by Project Director Nguyen Hoang Vinh, the website was officially launched on March 13, 2014. In hope of shortening the education quality gap between rural and urban areas, Zuni aims at providing an open online education gate to help teachers deliver their lessons to more students despite the long distance between them. Therefore, the project aims at shorten the education quality gap between rural and urban areas.

Products and services

Courses and topical materials
Zuni provides free e-lessons in various topics and courses for nationwide users. Until March 2014, the website had 300 lessons of eight subjects including  Mathematics, Physics, Chemistry, English, Literacy, Biography, History, Geography.

Renown Associate Professor Van Nhu Cuong is one of the teachers on Zuni and also an advisers of Zuni.

Test room
At the test room, Zuni.vn provides recent sample tests from renown Vietnamese high schools. Users can experience the feeling of a real examination by doing the multiple choice test under the pressure of time. In March 2014, Zuni had 1700 sample tests of eight subjects including  Mathematics, Physics, Chemistry, English, Literacy, Biography, History, Geography.

Question & Answer
Question & Answer room is where users can discuss, and share knowledge, homework solutions and ask others about learning experience. In order to improve the quality of question and answer room, Zuni has built a volunteer club to help answer users’ questions. They are the top students of university entrance exams and national exams for gifted students. In March 2014, the club had around 130 members. This has been done in a number of e-learning website such as 24GioHoc.com or TiengAnh123.com, etc. but Zuni continues to be the leaders.

News
Zuni news section contains three main categories:
 Education news collected and summarized from other sources.
 Learning experience shared by Zuni's students, volunteers and other sources
 Zuni's update, online and offline event.

References 

Vietnamese educational websites
Internet properties established in 2014
Virtual learning environments
2014 establishments in Vietnam